István Hasznos (8 December 1924 – 7 May 1998) was a Hungarian water polo player who competed in the 1952 Summer Olympics.

He was born and died in Szolnok.

Hasznos was part of the Hungarian team which won the gold medal in the 1952 tournament. He played two matches and scored seven goals.

See also
 Hungary men's Olympic water polo team records and statistics
 List of Olympic champions in men's water polo
 List of Olympic medalists in water polo (men)

External links
 

1924 births
1998 deaths
Hungarian male water polo players
Olympic water polo players of Hungary
Water polo players at the 1952 Summer Olympics
Olympic gold medalists for Hungary
Olympic medalists in water polo
Medalists at the 1952 Summer Olympics
People from Szolnok
Sportspeople from Jász-Nagykun-Szolnok County
20th-century Hungarian people